Nong Bun Mak is a district (amphoe) of Nakhon Ratchasima province, northeastern Thailand.

History

Nong Bunnak was created as a minor district (king amphoe) on 1 July 1983 by separating the three tambons, Nong Bunnak, Saraphi, and Thai Charoen, from Chok Chai district. It was upgraded to a full district on 25 May 1989. In 2003 the district was renamed from Nong Bunnak to Nong Bun Mak.

Geography
Neighbouring districts are (from the east clockwise): Nong Ki of Buriram province; Khon Buri, Chok Chai, and Chakkarat of Nakhon Ratchasima Province.

Administration
The district is divided into nine subdistricts (tambons), which are further subdivided into 104 villages (mubans). There are no municipal (thesaban) areas, and nine tambon administrative organisations (TAO).

References

External links
amphoe.com

Nong Bun Mak